During the 2002–03 English football season, Wrexham competed in the Football League Third Division.

Season summary
Wrexham finished third in the Third Division and thus gained automatic promotion to the Second Division.

First-team squad
Squad at end of season

Left club during season

League table

‡ - Boston United deducted four points due to financial irregularities

Leading goalscorer: Andy Morrell (Wrexham), 34

References

Wrexham A.F.C. seasons
Wrexham
Wrexham